The Paper Store is an American retail company based in Acton, Massachusetts that owns and operates approximately 100 specialty gift stores across the northeast and Florida. The company is a family business that offers "on-trend" products catering to a predominantly female demographic, with a selection that includes (but is not limited to) apparel & accessories, jewelry, bath & body products, stationery, baby & toddler gifts, kids' toys, jigsaw puzzles, books, and Hallmark Cards greeting cards. The Paper Store is currently the largest interdependently-owned group of Hallmark Gold Crown stores in The United States. Other highly recognizable brands featured in their stores include Alex and Ani, Vera Bradley, Lilly Pulitzer, Kate Spade, Life Is Good, Vineyard Vines, Pura Vida, Hydro Flask, and Ivory Ella.

History 

Bob Anderson founded The Paper Store in 1964, when he purchased a 700 sq. ft. newsstand in Maynard, Massachusetts after having graduated from Babson College. Soon after founding The Paper Store, the Anderson's expanded its reach in the community through distribution of its papers to local homes. They would soon carry and deliver The Shopper, a local publication, to homes in Maynard and surrounding towns. A second location eventually opened in Clinton, Massachusetts, at which time The Paper Store grew its inventory with office products, books, and greeting cards.

The business would continue to prosper, eventually splitting its successful distribution and retail components in 1972. In 1989, Bob's son John Anderson proposed significant growth in the company, which ultimately led to the opening of additional stores across multiple states.

In 2011, The Paper Store invested over $10 million to build "shop within a shop" areas featuring the jewelry brand Alex and Ani in many of their stores - a significant move for the company.

As of 2022, The Paper Store had expanded to include 100 brick and mortar locations throughout the Northeast and Florida. Bob's son Tom Anderson is CEO.

In July 2020, because of the COVID-19 related financial pressures The Paper Store filed for Chapter 11 bankruptcy protection at the U.S. District Court in Worcester, Massachusetts.

In November 2021, it was announced that the retailer would be acquiring to Hallmark Stores in Orlando, FL, further expanding business.

Philanthropy 

As of 2022, The Paper Store raised over $2,000,000 for charities in its stores' communities. Every year, the company holds a "Gift of Giving" charity event in its brick and mortar locations and through its online retail storefront. The event supports local food pantries, shelters, and more. The Paper Store also directly supports various organizations local to their stores including local school districts and first responders.

References 

1964 establishments in Massachusetts
Retail companies of the United States
Retail companies established in 1964
Acton, Massachusetts
Companies based in Middlesex County, Massachusetts
Companies that filed for Chapter 11 bankruptcy in 2020
Privately held companies based in Massachusetts